The following list is a discography of production by Alex da Kid, a British hip hop and pop music producer from London. It includes a list of songs produced, co-produced and remixed by year, artist, album and title.

Singles produced

Writing and production credits

References

External links
 Official website
 
 
 

Hip hop discographies
 
Discographies of American artists
Production discographies
Pop music discographies